Greg Bennett may refer to:

 Greg Bennett (triathlete) (born 1972), Australian triathlete
 Greg Bennett (writer) (born 1950), American space flight engineer and science fiction writer
 Greg Bennett Guitars, brand name of stringed instruments

de:Greg Bennett